Westinghouse may refer to:

Businesses

Current companies 
Westinghouse Electric Corporation, the company that manages the Westinghouse brand, with licensees:
Westinghouse Electric Company, providing nuclear power-related services
Westinghouse Electronics, which sells LED and LCD televisions
Russell Hobbs, Inc., licensed to make small appliances such as vacuum cleaners under the Westinghouse name, from 2002 to 2008
Siemens Energy Sector, the acquired non-nuclear energy divisions of Westinghouse Electric

Former companies and divisions 
Westinghouse Electric Corporation, renamed CBS Corporation in 1997
Westinghouse Broadcasting (Group W), now integrated into CBS Broadcasting, Inc.
White-Westinghouse, acquired by Electrolux in 1986
Westinghouse Electronic Systems Group, sold to Northrop Grumman in 1996
British Westinghouse, later subsumed into the General Electric Company
Westinghouse Air Brake Company, founding name of WABCO
Westinghouse Brake & Signal Company (1928 – c. 2000)
Westinghouse Signals, earlier name of Westinghouse Rail Systems
Westinghouse Brakes (UK), now part of Knorr-Bremse
Westinghouse Combustion Turbine Systems Division, a facility near the Philadelphia Airport later home to an industrial park, “Westinghouse Park”
Westinghouse Aviation Gas Turbine Division, maker of early turbojet engines (1945–1955)
Westinghouse Astronuclear Laboratory, late 1950s; Large, Pennsylvania; nuclear space propulsion technologies
Westinghouse Advanced Energy Systems Division, a renamed 1977 successor to Westinghouse Astronuclear Lab
Westinghouse Rail Systems, formerly Westinghouse Signals, part of Invensys
Compagnie des Freins et Signaux Westinghouse, a company in Aulnay-sous-Bois, France near Paris; see History of the transistor

Buildings and structures 
George Westinghouse Bridge, East Pittsburgh, Pennsylvania, USA
George Westinghouse, Jr., Birthplace and Boyhood Home, Central Bridge, New York, USA
Westinghouse Park, Pittsburgh, Pennsylvania, USA
Westinghouse Air Brake Company General Office Building, Wilmerding, Pennsylvania, USA
George Westinghouse Jones House, Niskayuna, New York, USA, home of a cousin and associate of George Westinghouse

Media 
Westinghouse Studio One, an American radio–television anthology series, created in 1947
List of Westinghouse Studio One episodes
Twelve Angry Men (Westinghouse Studio One), a teleplay by the studio
Westinghouse Desilu Playhouse, American television series which aired from 1958 to 1960
The Westinghouse Sign, a large, animated, electric sign located in Pittsburgh, Pennsylvania, USA
Westinghouse Works, 1904, a collection of short films of various Westinghouse manufacturing plants

People 
George Westinghouse (1846–1914), the founder of Westinghouse Electric Corporation

Products 
List of Westinghouse locomotives
Westinghouse Electric Company's AP1000, the first Generation III+ reactor to receive final design approval from the U.S.
Westinghouse Farm Engine, a small, vertical boilered farm engine made by George Westinghouse from 1886 to 1917
NZR RM class Westinghouse railcar, an experimental and inaugural railcar built in New Zealand in 1914

Science 
Westinghouse effect, a variant of the social-scientific observer's paradox
Westinghouse Science Talent Search, now called Intel Science Talent Search, an American science competition for high school students
Westinghouse transistron, an early bipolar transistor invented in France at "Compagnie des Freins et Signaux Westinghouse" by the German scientists Mataré and Welker

Other uses
Westinghouse High School (disambiguation)
George Westinghouse Award (disambiguation)